"Lose Myself" is a song by future bass producer K?D. It features singer Phil Good. It was released via PRMD Music.

Background 
The song features drums alongside a pulsing bass line and Good’s vocals. The production incorporates elements of house and future bass.

Chart history

References 

2017 songs
2017 singles
Electronic songs
Future bass songs